The 2020–21 South of Scotland Football League was the 75th season of the South of Scotland Football League, and the 7th season as the sixth tier of the Scottish football pyramid system. Stranraer reserves continued as the reigning champions due to the previous season being declared null and void.

The start of the league season was delayed until October 2020 because of the COVID-19 pandemic, and games were played behind closed doors due to Scottish Government restrictions.

On 11 January 2021 the league was suspended by the Scottish Football Association due to the escalating pandemic situation. On 1 April clubs voted to declare the season Null and void.

Teams

The following teams changed division after the 2019–20 season.

From South of Scotland League
Transferred to West of Scotland League
 Bonnyton Thistle

 Club with an SFA Licence eligible to participate in the Lowland League promotion play-off should they win the league. 

Caledonian Braves reserves and Stranraer reserves are ineligible for promotion.

League table

References

External links

6
2020–21 in European sixth tier association football leagues
2020–21 in Scottish football leagues
Scotland